Ralph Wilcox (born January 30, 1950) is an American actor and director who has appeared in many movies and guest roles on television series during his career in Hollywood, dating to the early 1970s. Some of his most memorable roles include "Jammin' Jim" Jenkins on the Emerald Cove segments of The Mickey Mouse Club, Mason Freeman in seaQuest 2032, and Mugambi in Tarzan: The Epic Adventures. He played the role of Uncle Henry in the original Broadway production of The Wiz.

He wrote, directed, and produced The Lena Baker Story (2008), which chronicled the life of Lena Baker, a 43-year-old African-American mother of three who was convicted of capital murder and executed in 1945 by the electric chair in Georgia. She received a full pardon in 2005.

Partial filmography

Actor
 Gordon's War (1973) .... Black hit man
 Crazy Joe (1974) .... Sam
 Maude (TV) (The Runaway) (1974).... Hinkley
 The Super Cops (1974) .... John Hayes
 Claudine (1974) .... Young Brother
 Big Eddie (TV) (1975) (main character) .... Raymond McKay
 The River Niger (1976) .... Al
 Good Times (1977) .... Robert
 Busting Loose (TV) (1977) (regular character) .... Raymond St. Williams
 The Wiz (1978) .... Uncle Henry / Crow / Field Mouse / Lord High Underling
 What's Happening!! (TV) (2 episodes) (1976–1978).... Allan, Danny Domino
 Buffalo Soldiers (TV) (1979) .... Oakley
 More American Graffiti (1979) .... Felix
 One in a Million (TV) (1980) (Main Character) .... Duke
 Happy Days (TV) (2 episodes) (1978–1981) .... Jason Davis
 Megaforce (1982) .... Zac
 Off the Wall (1983) .... Johnny Hammer
 Columbo: Columbo Cries Wolf (TV) (1990) .... Chief
 White Lie (TV) (1991) .... Len Madison Sr.
 Stompin' at the Savoy (TV) (1992) .... Herman
 Emerald Cove .... James "Jammin' Jim" Jenkins
 Cop and a Half (1993) .... Detective Matt McPhail
 China Moon (1994) .... Ballistic Technician
 Fortune Hunter (TV) (1994) .... President Savimbe
 Matlock (TV) (4 episodes) (1993–1995)
 Saved by the Light (TV) (1995) .... Dr. Tomasson
 seaQuest DSV (TV) (1995/1996) (Series Regular) .... Mason Freeman
 Last Dance (1996) .... Warden Rice
 Tarzan: The Epic Adventures (TV) (1996).... Mugambi
 A Different Kind of Christmas (TV) (1996) .... Doctor Nichols
 Palmetto (1998) .... Judge
 From the Earth to the Moon (TV mini-series) (1998) .... V.I.P.
 The Last Marshal (1999) .... Lukowski
 Sheena (TV) (Sanctuary) (2001)

Director, writer and producer
 The Lena Baker Story (2008)
Christmas in the Smokies
Dallas Bullock (2015)

Trivia
Appeared alongside fellow seaQuest actress Karen Fraction on two other occasions, first in Palmetto and in an episode of Sheena, called "Sanctuary".

External links
 

American male television actors
American male film actors
Film directors from Wisconsin
African-American male actors
Male actors from Milwaukee
Living people
1950 births
Film producers from Wisconsin
21st-century African-American people
20th-century African-American people